The  was the 66th edition of NHK's Kōhaku Uta Gassen, held on December 31, 2015, live from NHK Hall from 19:15 (JST) to 23:45 (JST), with a 5-minute break for latest news. This is the 27th Heisei Era edition. Broadcasting time was announced on September 16. The 2015 Broadcast marks the 65th anniversary of Kouhaku Utagassen which started in 1951. The red team won this event, beating out the white team with a final score of 356,832 to 346,929.

Broadcast
Yuji Itano, NHK Broadcasting General-Director, revealed on September 16 that the 66th Kouhaku will air on December 31, starting from 19:15 JST and ending at 23:45 JST, with a 5-minute break for news. On Japan, the broadcast is made by NHK-G and Radio 1, and worldwide by NHK World Premium (Note that airs between 10:15 and 14:45 UTC). Kouhaku airs worldwide since 1998. Viewers outside Japan can watch the Kouhaku on NHK World Premium, at 10:15 UTC airing on a same time with NHK-G.

On November 26, captains and announcers, along with performers were revealed, and this year's theme is "That's Nippon! That's Kōhaku!".

Songs which artists will perform are revealed on December 21, and performance order was announced on Christmas Eve. On December 25, the judges were revealed. Rehearsals took place on 29 and 30 December. On December 31, the festival was broadcast live, culminating in the victory of Akagumi (breaking a sequence of Shirogumi's 3 consecutive wins); Haruka Ayase received the championship flag from the hands of the judge Masato Sakai. This was the first victory of Akagumi since 2011.

With the 2015 victory, Akagumi accumulated 30 wins, while Shirogumi continues with 36 victories.

This Kōhaku is also notable for being the last Kōhaku by former AKB48 general captain and Team A Member Minami Takahashi 1 year prior to her graduation.

Personnel

Main host and team leaders 
 Red Team Captain: Haruka Ayase
 White Team Captain: Yoshihiko Inohara (V6)
 Host: Tetsuko Kuroyanagi & Yumiko Udō

Live Comments 
 Announcer NHK Radio 1: Yuka Kubota
 PR, Commentary: Bananaman

Judges 
 Kasumi Arimura (actress), starred in Flying Colors
 Nahoko Uehashi (writer), representative work, Moribito: Guardian of the Spirit
 Yo Oizumi (actor)
 Masato Sakai (actor), will star in Sanada Maru
 Tao Tsuchiya (actress), starred in Mare
 George Tokoro (comedian)
 Masami Nagasawa (actress)
 Yuzuru Hanyu (figure skater)
 Naoki Matayoshi (comedian and writer), won the Akutagawa Prize
 Hiromi Miyake (weightlifter)

Contestants 
This year there was 51 artists in total, 25 for the red team and white team at 26. 10 artists performed for the first time.

SPECIAL GUESTS
Misia
Sachiko Kobayashi
Darth Vader, Stormtroopers, R2-D2, C-3PO, BB-8 
Mickey & Minnie Mouse
Asa ga Kita cast
Princess Tenko 
Atsuko Maeda 
Yuko Oshima 
King Cream Soda 
Kotono Mitsuishi 
Rika Matsumoto 
Ikue Ōtani 
Takanori Nishikawa

Artists not invited this year
RED TEAM Ayaka, Nana Mizuki, Momoiro Clover Z, Kyary Pamyu Pamyu, SKE48, HKT48, Kaori Kozai, Sayaka Kanda, Miyuki Nakajima, Hiroko Yakushimaru, May J., Yoshino Nanjou
WHITE TEAM Tsuyoshi Nagabuchi, T.M.Revolution, Chris Hart,  Kouhei Fukuda, Pornograffiti.

Performance Order 
It was announced on December 24. Go Hiromi and Sakurako Ohara were the first artists to perform. The finalistas (Ootori) were Masahiko Kondo and Seiko Matsuda. Two artists performed live from a remote location: Masaharu Fukuyama (from Pacific Convention Plaza) and Bump of Chicken (from Makuhari Messe). This was the last appearance of Shinichi Mori (who announced his honorable retirement from Kouhaku). AAA, for being a mixed musical group, served again in Akagumi.  

First Part 
   
   
   
   
   
   
   
   
   
   
   
 Anime Kouhaku

   
   
   
   
   
   
   
   
   
   
   
   
   
   

Last Part 
   
   
   
   
   
 That's SHOWTIME! ~Hoshi ni Negai wo~
 
   
    
   
   
   
   
   
   
   
   
   
   
   
   
   
   
   
   
   
   
   
   
   
   
   
 

Songs Performed on Medleys
 Masaharu Fukuyama "I Am A HERO", "Niji", "Hello", "Sakurazaka"
 Arashi: "Sakura", "Ai wo Sakebe"
 AKB48: "Aitakatta", "Flying Get", "Heavy Rotation", "Koisuru Fortune Cookie"
 Exile: "24karats Gold Soul", "Rising Sun"
 V6: "Music For The People", "Ai Nanda"
 X Japan: "Forever Love", "Born to Be Free"
 SMAP: "Triangle", "Otherside"
 Mariko Takahashi: "Goban Machi no Mari e", "Momoiro Toiki"

Staff 
 Produced by: NHK Enterprise
 Executive Producer: Yuji Itano
 AKB48 SHOW Producer: Masashi Nishi
 AKB48 SHOW Director: Tomoko Matsuda
 Original Concept: Tsumoru Kondo
 Music Producer: Tsunaki Mihara (The New Breed)
 "Hotaru no Hikari" Conductor: Maasaki Hirao
 "Moonlight Densetsu" performers: Mayu Watanabe, Sakura Miyawaki, Haruka Kodama, Haruka Shimazaki, Anna Iriyama (AKB48)

Final Results & Ratings

Production
Every year, representatives of each of the two teams in Kōhaku are announced between the 1st and 15 October, and the artists who will participate are disclosed in late November. However, this year, according to some news portals and Japanese newspapers reported, NHK had to delay the announcement of representatives after Tamori, renowned Japanese TV host, refused participation in Kōhaku. In response, NHK started searching for another representative. Rumors began to surface that Yoshihiko Inohara (V6) would serve as Tamori's replacement. Both representatives and participating artists were announced on November 26, the day the line-up is traditionally revealed.

Haruka Ayase received the Championship Flag from guest judge Masato Sakai.

References

NHK Kōhaku Uta Gassen events
2015 in Japanese music
2015 in Japanese television